Southern Valley Schools, also known as Southern Valley School District #540, is a consolidated public school district located in Oxford, Nebraska, United States,  west of Stamford. The district was established in 1993, providing education for students in the communities of Beaver City, Edison, Hendley, Hollinger, Orleans, Oxford, and Stamford. The individual schools include Southern Valley High School and Southern Valley Elementary.

2010–2011 district characteristics

References

External links
 Nebraska Department of Education: 2010-2011 State of the Schools Report

1993 establishments in Nebraska
Education in Harlan County, Nebraska
Education in Furnas County, Nebraska
School districts established in 1993
School districts in Nebraska